Longueuil Collège Français are a junior "A" ice hockey team from Longueuil, Quebec, and a member of the Quebec Junior Hockey League. The Collège Français headquarters are in Longueuil, Quebec, while the team plays at Colisée Jean Béliveau.

History
Longueuil won the NAPA Cup as league championship in 1989–90, 1996–97, 2010–11, 2012–13, and 2014–15. Two Longueuil alumni have played in the National Hockey League. Daniel Shank played for the Longueuil Sieurs in 1983–84, and Wally Weir played for the Longueuil Rebels in 1973–74.

Season-by-season record
Note: GP = Games Played, W = Wins, L = Losses, T = Ties, OTL = Overtime Losses, GF = Goals for, GA = Goals against

Fred Page Cup
Eastern Canada Championships
MHL - QAAAJHL - CCHL - Host
Round robin play with 2nd vs 3rd in semi-final to advance against 1st in the finals.

 - Terrebonne league champs but also Fred Page hosts.  Therefore Longuiel is LQHL rep.

External links
Collège_Français de Longueuil

Ligue de Hockey Junior AAA Quebec teams
Sport in Longueuil